Creighton B. Coleman (born May 12, 1956) is an American attorney and politician. He is a former member of the South Carolina Senate from the 17th District, serving from 2018 to 2016, and the South Carolina House of Representatives from the 41st district, serving from 2000 to 2008. He is a member of the Democratic party, and served as the chair of the Fairfield County Democratic Party in 1998.

References

Living people
1956 births
Democratic Party South Carolina state senators
21st-century American politicians
People from Winnsboro, South Carolina
The Citadel, The Military College of South Carolina alumni
University of South Carolina alumni